

Utilitarian genocide is one of five forms of genocide categorized and defined in 1975 by genocide scholar Vahakn Dadrian. Utilitarian genocide is distinctly different from ideologically motivated genocides like the Holocaust and the Cambodian genocide. This form of genocide has as its aim some form of material gain, such as the seizure of territory in order to gain control of economic resources for commercial exploitation. Two given examples of this form are the genocide of indigenous peoples in Brazil and the genocide of indigenous peoples in Paraguay.

This form of genocide was highly prominent during the European colonial expansions into the Americas, Asia, and Africa. The indigenous population collapsed from a combination of murder, enslavement and disease (mostly smallpox). Dadrian has also given as further examples of utilitarian genocide the murders of Moors and Jews during the Spanish Inquisition and the deaths of Cherokee Indians during the westward expansion of the United States via the process of Indian removal.

This type of genocide has continued into the twentieth century, with the ongoing genocide of indigenous tribes in the rain forests of South America primarily due to industrial progress and the development of resources within their territories; as these regions are exploited for economic gain the indigenous peoples are considered a "hindrance" and are forcibly relocated or killed.

See also 

 Mercantilism

Notes

References

Citations

Sources 

European colonization of the Americas
History of colonialism
Spanish Inquisition
Genocides
Historical controversies